Sands of Time EP is the debut EP by the Australian power metal band Black Majesty.

Track listing
All songs written by Black Majesty & Cory Betts.
 Fall of the Reich - 05:16
 Guardian - 06:57
 Beyond Reality - 08:19

Credits

Band members
 John "Gio" Cavaliere − lead vocals
 Stevie Janevski − guitars, backing vocals
 Hanny Mohamed − guitars, keyboards
 Pavel Konvalinka  − drums

Additional musicians
 Evan Harris − Bass on track 2
 Cory Betts − Bass on tracks 1 & 3 
 Danny Cecati - Dual vocal on track 3
 Pep Samartino - Keyboards and backing vocals on track 3
 Jason Old - Backing Vocals on track 2
 Endel Rivers - Keyboards on track 1

Production and other arrangements
 Endel Rivers - Engineering, Mixing, Mastering
 Mark Kelson - Cover concept, artwork, Sleeve design

2003 debut EPs
Black Majesty albums